Packera cana is a species of flowering plant in the aster family known by the common name woolly groundsel. It is native to western and central North America, where it can be found in a wide array of habitat types at all elevations from grassland to the alpine climates of mountain peaks.

It is a perennial herb producing one erect stem from a rosette of basal leaves and a rhizome system. It generally grows up to 40 centimeters in maximum height. It is a woolly plant, its herbage coated in whitish hairs. The basal leaves have lance-shaped to oval blades which may have smooth or toothed edges. They are a few centimeters long and are borne on petioles. Leaves higher on the stem are smaller and simpler.

The inflorescence contains several flower heads, each lined with woolly green phyllaries. The head contains many golden yellow disc florets and generally either 8 or 13 narrow yellow ray florets each up to a centimeter long. The fruit is an achene around a centimeter long, including its pappus of bristles.

External links
Jepson Manual Treatment
USDA Plants Profile
Flora of North America
Washington Burke Museum
Photo gallery

cana
Flora of the Western United States
Flora of California
Flora of Colorado
Flora of the Sierra Nevada (United States)
Flora of the Rocky Mountains
Taxa named by William Jackson Hooker
Flora without expected TNC conservation status